Golden Sky is the third and final EP released by Japanese rock band, The Teenage Kissers. The EP was released January 21, 2016 to coincide with the beginning of their Golden Sky Tour. The EP was released in standard CD format, as well as 3 separate 2-song cassette tapes. It was announced that the Golden Sky tour will be the band's last tour and Golden Sky will be the band's final release. On May 20, 2016 the band announced they would be going on hiatus to focus on their respective solo projects.

Track listing

Personnel
 Nana Kitade – Vocals, lyrics
 Hideo Nekota – Bass
 Mai Koike – Drums
 Tsubasa Nakada – Guitar

References

2016 EPs
EPs by Japanese artists
The Teenage Kissers albums